Lee Greig (born 25 August 1987) is a Scottish professional wrestler and actor, better known by his ring name Jack Jester He wrestles for numerous promotions in the British independent wrestling circuit, but is best known for his work in Insane Championship wrestling where he is a former ICW Heavyweight Champion.
Greig is a Wrestling Coach at GPWA Glasgow Asylum.

Greig has appeared in several professional wrestling documentaries including The British Wrestler (VICE) and Smack 'Em Up (RTÉ). He was also one of the stars of BBC documentaries Insane Fight Club and Insane Fight Club 2. In 2016, Jester challenged Drew Galloway for the TNA World Heavyweight Championship.

He was raised in the Fernhill area of Rutherglen, and began wrestling at the age of 16.

Championships and accomplishments
 British Wrestling Revolution
 BWR Anarchy Briefcase (2018)
 BWR Heavyweight Championship (1 time)
Insane Championship Wrestling
 ICW World Heavyweight Championship (1 time)
 ICW Tag Team Championship (1 time) - with Sha Samuels
 King of Insanity (1 time, current)
 British Championship Wrestling
 BCW Cruiserweight Championship (2 times)
 BCW Tag Team Championship (1 time) - with Mikey Whiplash
 Jimmy Havoc Presents Wrestling
Hardcore Tournament (2016)
 Premier British Wrestling
 PBW Heavyweight Championship (1 time)
 PBW Heavyweight Title Tournament (2015)
Preston City Wrestling
PCW Tag Team Championship (1 time) - with Sha Samuels
 Scottish Wrestling Alliance
 NWA Scottish Heavyweight Championship (1 time)
 House of Pain: Evolution
 HOPE Championship (3 times)
 Rock N Wrestle
 RNW Highland Championship (2 times)
 WrestleZone
 WrestleZone Undisputed Championship (1 time)

References

1987 births
Living people
Scottish male professional wrestlers
People from Rutherglen
Sportspeople from Glasgow
21st-century professional wrestlers